George Edward Ackles (born July 4, 1967) is an American former professional basketball player. He was selected in the 1991 NBA draft as the 29th overall pick after a very successful collegiate career at UNLV. Ackles never played a game in the NBA, however, but still managed to carve out a professional career spanning from 1991 to 2002 with stops in leagues all over the world.

References

External links
 Liga ACB profile

1967 births
Living people
American expatriate basketball people in Argentina
American expatriate basketball people in Canada
American expatriate basketball people in China
American expatriate basketball people in Cyprus
American expatriate basketball people in Lebanon
American expatriate basketball people in Mexico
American expatriate basketball people in Spain
American expatriate basketball people in Switzerland
American men's basketball players
Basketball players from North Carolina
Basketball players from Pittsburgh
Beijing Ducks players
Centers (basketball)
Club Ourense Baloncesto players
Columbus Horizon players
Fargo-Moorhead Fever players
Fribourg Olympic players
Garden City Broncbusters men's basketball players
Keravnos B.C. players
Las Vegas Silver Bandits players
Liga ACB players
Miami Heat draft picks
Peñarol de Mar del Plata basketball players
Power forwards (basketball)
Rapid City Thrillers players
Rochester Renegade players
Shanghai Sharks players
Soles de Jalisco players
UNLV Runnin' Rebels basketball players